The Dreadnought class is the future replacement for the Vanguard class of ballistic missile submarines. Like their predecessors they will carry Trident II D-5 missiles. The Vanguard submarines entered service in the United Kingdom in the 1990s with an intended service life of 25 years. Their replacement is necessary if the Royal Navy is to maintain a continuous at-sea deterrent (CASD), the principle of operation behind the Trident system.

Provisionally named "Successor" (being the successor to the Vanguard class SSBNs), it was officially announced in 2016 that the first of class would be named Dreadnought, and that the class would be the Dreadnought class. The next three boats will be called Valiant, Warspite and King George VI.

Background

Since the retirement of the last Royal Air Force WE.177 nuclear bomb in 1998, the British nuclear arsenal has been wholly submarine-based. It is intended to deter a potential enemy because they cannot ensure eliminating the entire stockpile in a first strike if a ballistic missile submarine remains undetected.

Since the Strategic Defence Review (SDR), the UK has maintained a stockpile of around 215 warheads, with around 120 active (usable). Under the continuous at sea deterrence policy, at least one  SSBN is kept on patrol with up to 16 Trident missiles sharing up to 48 warheads from the stockpile at any given time. The SDR considered this was the minimum  number of warheads adequate for deterrence.  It is collectively known as the Trident system. The majority of this system is based in Scotland at HMNB Clyde (HMS Neptune), which includes the Faslane home of the Vanguard submarines, and at RNAD Coulport on Loch Long. The oldest Vanguard-class submarine had been expected to remain in service until 2019 without a refit. Since 1998, the system has also provided the Government with the option of a lower-yield, "sub-strategic" nuclear strike capability. Under both the Strategic Defence and Security Review 2010 and the Strategic Defence and Security Review 2015, the total number of warheads for the submarine on patrol will be 40 and the maximum total number of ballistic missiles will be 8.

Decision

In May 2011 the government approved the initial assessment phase for the new submarines and authorised the purchase of long lead-time items including steel for the hulls. In May 2015 the Conservative Party won the UK General Election on a manifesto which included a commitment to maintaining a CASD with four Successor submarines. The final decision to commit to the Successor programme was approved on 18 July 2016 when the House of Commons voted to renew Trident by 472 votes to 117. 
Successor generated controversy because of its cost, and because some political parties and campaign groups such as the Campaign for Nuclear Disarmament (CND) and Trident Ploughshares oppose the retention of CASD or any nuclear weapons by the UK on moral or financial grounds.

Construction
Construction started in late 2016 at the Barrow-in-Furness shipyard operated by BAE Systems Submarines, when the first submarine was provisionally expected to enter service in 2028. The start of construction of the second phase was announced in May 2018.
, the Ministry of Defence (MoD) expects the first submarine to enter service in the early 2030s. Total programme cost is expected to be £31 billion.

The submarines will have an intended service life of around 35 to 40 years, an increase of around 50% over the previous class. 

The MoD said in December 2018 that construction of the first submarine was on schedule and within budget. In April 2021, The Sunday Times reported that delays on the Astute class submarines may impact the Dreadnought class, which will be built in the same dock hall. Related concerns are a 19 month delay to an extension of the Barrow facility and a five year delay to a Rolls-Royce factory which will build the nuclear reactors. However, the Ministry of Defence commented that "the Dreadnought programme remains on track to deliver to schedule, with the first in class expected to enter service in the early 2030s."

Boats of the class

See also

Future of the Royal Navy
Letters of last resort
List of submarines of the Royal Navy
List of submarine classes of the Royal Navy
Nuclear weapons and the United Kingdom
Royal Navy Submarine Service
Submarine-launched ballistic missile
United Kingdom and weapons of mass destruction

References

Further reading
UK House of Commons, Select Committee on Defence The Future of the UK's Strategic Nuclear Deterrent: the White Paper: Ninth Report of Session 2006-07, House of Commons Papers, HC 225 [2005-2007]
UK House of Commons, Select Committee on Defence The Future of the UK's Strategic Nuclear Deterrent: the Manufacturing and Skills Base: Fourth Report of Session 2006–07, House of Commons Papers, HC 59 [2005-2007]

 Dreadnought Class Guide - 21 October 2016
 Meet the Dreadnought class, new nuclear submarines named - 16 December 2016

External links 
 
Government White Paper Cm 6994 The Future of the United Kingdom's Nuclear Deterrent (December 2006)

United Kingdom defence procurement
2000s in the United Kingdom
2010s in the United Kingdom
Trident (UK nuclear programme)
Nuclear submarines of the Royal Navy
Submarine classes
Ballistic missile submarines